Eriothrix is a genus of flies in the family Tachinidae.

Species
Eriothrix accolus Kolomiets, 1967
Eriothrix apennina (Rondani, 1862)
Eriothrix argyreatus (Meigen, 1824)
Eriothrix furva Kolomiets, 1967
Eriothrix inflatus Kolomiets, 1967
Eriothrix micronyx Stein, 1924
Eriothrix monticola (Egger, 1856)
Eriothrix nasuta Kolomiets, 1967
Eriothrix nitida Kolomiets, 1967
Eriothrix penitalis (Coquillett, 1897)
Eriothrix prolixa (Meigen, 1824)
Eriothrix rohdendorfi Kolomiets, 1967
Eriothrix rufomaculata (De Geer, 1776)
Eriothrix sledzinskii (Draber-Mońko & Kolomiets, 1982)
Eriothrix stackelbergi Kolomiets, 1967
Eriothrix umbrinervis Mesnil, 1957

References

Dexiinae
Diptera of Europe
Diptera of Asia
Diptera of North America
Tachinidae genera
Taxa named by Johann Wilhelm Meigen